The Titan Cup was a triangular One Day International cricket tournament held in India between 17 October and 6 November 1996 involving South Africa, Australia and India. Although South Africa had won all its round-robin matches, it lost in the final to India. The tournament was sponsored by and named after Titan Industries (a subsidiary of the Tata Group).

Background
The Titan Cup was held after the inaugural series of the Border–Gavaskar Trophy between India and Australia. It was a one-Test series held in New Delhi, and was won by India, and served as the commencement of South Africa's tour of India later that season. Having won the Pepsi Sharjah Cup and five out of their six matches in the World Cup that year, South Africa were considered favorites to win the competition. They were also coming on the back of winning a four-nation ODI tournament, the Kenya Centenary Cup, where they defeated a strong Pakistan side in the final, and having lost only one game leading into the final, that to world champions Sri Lanka. Captain Hansie Cronje admitted that his side were "in cracking one-day form" before the Titan Cup commenced. Australia, the runners-up in the World Cup, were considered second favorites. India, having not won any ODI competition leading into the tournament, had seen the team captaincy change hands from veteran Mohammad Azharuddin to the then 23-year-old star batsman Sachin Tendulkar.

Before their first game against India, South Africa played a practice game in Gymkhana Ground in Secunderabad dividing themselves into two teams and with members of the Hyderabad, the local first-class team.

Squads

The South Africa coaching staff was headed by Bob Woolmer, with Robbie Muzzell accompanying the squad as the manager. The squad arrived in India on 14 October 1996 without their four regular team players: medium pace bowler Craig Matthews, batsman Jacques Kallis, all-rounder Shaun Pollock and spinner Paul Adams. Gary Kirsten was named the new vice-captain of the side.

The India team coach was Madan Lal. Debutants included Karnataka opening batsman Sujith Somasunder and Tamil Nadu all-rounder Robin Singh. The squad for their first three games was announced on 13 October 1996. On 23 October, for the remaining three of the group stage games following the loss to South Africa, the Indian selectors brought in Navjot Singh Sidhu in place of Sujith Somasunder.

Results
South Africa won all their round-robin matches against India and Australia. Australia did not win any of their matches, losing two of  their encounters against India. In third match, Anil Kumble along with Javagal Srinath helped India to win their ODI match against Australia in Bangalore. The duo added 52 runs for 9th wicket partnership, after Sachin Tendulkar got out at 88 when India was 164/8, chasing a target of 216 runs. The India-Australia match in Cuttack was abandoned due to rain, resulting in both teams getting one point each. In the 9th and last round-robin match, which was a virtual semi-final, India won by 5 runs defending 289, their highest ever total against Australia then. India managed to qualify for the final against South Africa on the strength of their two round-robin victories against Australia.

Matches 

Going into the match, South Africa had a marginally better record with nine wins against eight losses over India. Electing to bat first upon winning the toss in front of a 35,000-strong crowd, South Africa got off to a fine start after a maiden over by paceman Javagal Srinath. Openers Gary Kirsten and Andrew Hudson then put together a partnership of 74 at 14 overs. Kirsten particularly punished India's spinner Sunil Joshi during his knock of 81, supported well by Daryll Cullinan (16), who added 43 together for the third wicket. A middle-order collapse — three wickets for 21 runs — was followed by a stand of 76 between Cronje and Brian McMillan. Cronje remained unbeaten at 65 at the end helping take his team to 261 for the loss of seven wickets. Anil Kumble was India's best bowler for the innings picking wickets of Kirsten, pinch-hitter Pat Symcox and Derek Crookes.

India began poorly losing debutante Sujith Somasunder and captain Sachin Tendulkar early, before Mohammad Azharuddin and Rahul Dravid put together 67 runs for the third wicket. Dravid was India's best batsman in the game who made a patient 62 before top-edging Crookes while attempting to sweep him. Sourav Ganguly was involved in a mix-up with Dravid while attempting a sharp single off Fanie de Villiers and crashing into him, before McMillan ran him out. Despite being declared out, South Africa captain Cronje recalled Ganguly, only before he lost his wicket to Allan Donald, who also dismissed Ajay Jadeja. The tail fell cheaply and India were all out for 214, short of the opposition's score by 47 runs. Jonty Rhodes stood out for Cronje's team in the field affecting two run outs, while de Villiers' accurate bowling restricted India's scoring. However, Kirsten's innings of 84 won him the man of the match award.

Final

Records and awards
India's Titan Cup win was its first ODI tournament victory in 1996, as well as the first under captain Sachin Tendulkar. Tendulkar was the lead run-scorer in the tournament, with 320 runs in 6 innings. With 17 wickets, Allan Donald of South Africa won the player of the series award.

Broadcast 
It was announced in October 1996 that the tournament would be broadcast live on ESPN and Doordarshan in Indian television.

References

External links 
 Tournament home on ESPNcricinfo
 Tournament home on ESPNcricinfo archive
 

1996 in cricket
International cricket competitions from 1994–95 to 1997
Indian cricket seasons from 1970–71 to 1999–2000
1996–97 Australian cricket season
South African cricket seasons from 1970–71 to 1999–2000
1996 in Indian sport
One Day International cricket competitions
Tata Group